" is the 30th single by Zard, released 14 October 1999 under the B-Gram Records label. This is Zard's last single released in 8 cm CD format. The single opened at #5 rank the first week. It charted for six weeks and sold over 124,000 copies.

Track list
All songs are written by Izumi Sakai.

composer and arrangement: 4D-JAM
(Re-mix)
remix: FAST ALVA and ME-YA
 (original karaoke)

References

1999 singles
Zard songs
1999 songs
Songs written by Izumi Sakai